The First Deputy Premier of the Soviet Union was the deputy head of government of the Union of Soviet Socialist Republics (USSR); despite the title, the office was not necessarily held by a single individual. The office had three different names throughout its existence: First Deputy Chairman of the Council of People's Commissars (1923–1946), First Deputy Chairman of the Council of Ministers (1946–1991) and First Deputy Prime Minister of the Soviet Union (1991). The term first deputy premier was used by outside commentators to describe the office of first deputy head of government.

A First Deputy Premier was responsible over a specific policy area. For example, Kirill Mazurov was responsible for industry, while Dmitry Polyansky was accorded agriculture. In addition, an officeholder would be responsible for coordinating the activities of ministries, state committees and other bodies subordinated to the government. It was expected that a First Deputy gave these organs guidance in an expeditious manner to ensure the implementation of plans for economic and social development and to check if the orders and decisions of the government were being followed. If the premier could not perform his duties one of the first deputies would take on the role of acting premier until the premier's return. During the late 1970s, when the health of Premier Alexei Kosygin deteriorated, Nikolai Tikhonov as first deputy acted on his behalf during his absence. At last, a first deputy was by right a member of the government Presidium, its highest decision-making organ.

A total of 26 individuals have held this post. The first officeholder was Valerian Kuibyshev, who was inaugurated in 1934. Lavrentiy Beria spent the shortest time in office and served for 113 days. At over seventeen years, Vyacheslav Molotov spent the longest time in office, and held his position through most of Joseph Stalin's chairmanship, as well as through the chairmanships of Georgy Malenkov and Nikolai Bulganin.

Officeholders

See also
 Premier of the Soviet Union
 Deputy Premier of the Soviet Union
 List of leaders of the Soviet Union

Notes

References

First Deputy Premier
Lists of office-holders in the Soviet Union
First Deputy Premier
Soviet Union